Haven is a 2005 album by Anglo-Irish band Flook.

Track listing
 "The Tortoise and the Hare" – 5:32
 "Gone Fishing" – 4:03
 "Mouse Jigs" – 4:23
 "Souter Creek" – 5:10
 "Asturian Way" – 4:14
 "Wrong Foot Forward" – 5:44
 "Padraig's" – 4:34
 "Road to Errogie" – 4:51
 "On One Beautiful Day" – 3:31

2005 albums
Flook (band) albums